Caro Niederer (born 1963 in Zürich) is a contemporary artist who lives and works in Zürich.

Niederer works in a variety of media. Her work encompasses techniques such as painting, photography, video as well as silk tapestries. Niederer is, along with Pipilotti Rist and Sylvie Fleury, one of the most popular contemporary female Swiss artists. Human day-to-day situations from her private life and her immediate environment are the source for most of Niederer's works. These personal snapshots are then re-worked in paintings or form the template for huge hand knotted silk carpets, which the artist gets produced in China. The transformation of an image through its replication in another media is a core theme of Niederer's work. In an ongoing photo series called Interieurs Niederer photographs her sold works in situ in their new owners' homes and offices.

Recent major museums exhibitions include Kunstmuseum St.Gallen (2017/2018), CAC Malaga (2006), Haus Lange, Krefeld (2006), Douglas Hyde Gallery, Dublin (2005), Ikon Gallery, Birmingham (2005) and Kunstmuseum St. Gallen (2004).

Exhibitions

Solo exhibitions
2019
Good Luck, complete Works, Geneva, Switzerland
2018
Print Works, Kunstgriff, Zurich, Switzerland
Good Life Ceramics, Kunstmuseum St.Gallen, St. Gallen, Switzerland
2017
Good Life Ceramics, Kunstmuseum St. Gallen, St.Gallen, Switzerland
2006
Souvenir and Conversations, CAC – Centro de Arte Contemporaneo de Málaga, Malaga, Spain
Leben mit Kunst / Living with Art, Haus Lange, Krefeld, Germany (travelling exhibition)
2005
The Douglas Hyde Gallery, Dublin, Ireland
Leben mit Kunst / Living with Art, Ikon Gallery, Birmingham, UK (travelling exhibition)
2004
Leben mit Kunst / Living with Art, Kunstmuseum St. Gallen, St.Gallen, Switzerland (travelling exhibition)
2003
Memoria e Valore, Le Case d'Arte, Milan, Italy
1995
Öffentliche und Private Bilder, Kunstverein Friedrichshafen, Germany
1994
Abbilder, Ausstellungsraum Künstlerhaus Stuttgart, Stuttgart, Germany
1993
Kunsthalle St. Gallen, St. Gallen, Switzerland
1992
Säntis, curated by Hans-Ulrich Obrist, Säntis Bergstation, Schwaegalp, Switzerland,
1990
Souvenirs, Kunsthaus Oerlikon, Zurich, Switzerland
Cairo Atelier, Cairo, Egypt

Group exhibitions
2020

Subject sitting in a darkened room. Barbara Seiler, Zurich
Sommer des Zögerns. Kunsthalle Zürich
Conversations about Work. Kino Süd, Weiss Falk, Basel

2016
A Being in the World, curated by Jayson Musson and Fabienne Stephan, Salon 94 Bowery, New York, USA
2015
Heimspiel, Kunstmuseum St. Gallen, St. Gallen, Switzerland
Don't Shoot the Painter – UBS Art Collection, Villa Reale's Galleria d'Arte Moderna, Milan, Italy
2014
Gastspiel. Schweizer Gegenwartskunst im Museum Rietberg, Zurich, Switzerland
2012
The Prestige of Painting from Europe: The Future Lasts Forever, Interalia Art Compagny, Seoul, Korea
Heimspiel, Kunstmuseum St. Gallen, St. Gallen, Switzerland
The Art on your Wall, Artclub 1563, Seoul, Korea
Das eigene Kind im Blick, Kunsthalle Emden, Emden, Germany
2009
Heimspiel 09, Kunstmuseum St. Gallen, St. Gallen, Switzerland
Tracing Reality I, Kunstraum Riehen, Riehen, Switzerland
Gefrorene Momente / Frozen Moments, Kunstmuseum Chur, Chur, Switzerland
Locating Home, Harewood House, Harewood, UK
2006
Hyperdesign, Shanghai Biennale, Shanghai, China
2005
Painting the Edge, Gallery Hyundai, Seoul, Korea
2004
Kunst für die Kunst, Kunsthalle St. Gallen, St. Gallen, Switzerland
Appenzeller Frauenaufzug, Zeughaus Teufen, Teufen, Switzerland
Citazioni, Le Case d'Arte, Milan, Italy
2003
Heimspiel, Kunsthalle St. Gallen, St. Gallen, Switzerland
2002
Heimspiel, Zeughaus Teufen, Teufen, Switzerland
Interior / Exterior (with A. Goldsworthy), Cultureel Centrum De Romaanse Poort, Leuven, Belgium
2001
WertWechsel, Museum für Angewandte Kunst, Cologne, Germany
2000
Kontext, Kunsthalle Kornwestheim, Germany
1999
Bunte Hintergründe und klassische Porträts (with Bruno Müller-Meyer),
1998
Wish you were here (with Andreas Rüthi und Bruno Müller-Meyer), Milch, London, UK
Salon, Kunstverein St. Gallen, St. Gallen, Switzerland
Geschlossene Gesellschaft, Kunstmarkt Dresden, Dresden, Germany
Non-Painters-Painting, Galerie Berlintokio, Berlin, Germany
1997
SüdwestLB Druckgraphik Kunstpreis 1997, SüdwestLB Forum, Stuttgart, Germany
Alpenblick, die zeitgenössische Kunst und das Alpine, Kunsthalle Wien, Vienna, Austria
Objets du désir, Museum Bellerive, Zurich, Switzerland
Kunst & Kiosk (with Véronique Zusseau), Alte Konsumbäckerei, Solothurn, Switzerland
Geschlossene Gesellschaft, Graphische Sammlung der ETH Zürich, Zurich, Switzerland
1996
Doppelbindung / Linke Masche, Kunstverein München, Munich, Germany
Auszug, Kunstverein Friedrichshafen, Friedrichshafen, Germany
!Hello world?, Museum für Gestaltung, Zurich, Switzerland
1995
SüdwestLB Druckgraphik Kunstpreis 1995, SüdwestLB Forum, Stuttgart, Germany
Inventar 95/96, Helmhaus Zürich, Zurich, Switzerland
Werk- und Atelierstipendium 1995, Helmhaus Zürich, Zurich, Switzerland
1994
Merry-go-round, Shedhalle, Zurich, Switzerland
Eidgenössisches Kunststipendium 1994, Messe Basel, Basel, Switzerland
Werk- und Atelierstipendium 1994, Helmhaus Zürich, Zurich, Switzerland
1993
Informationsdienst c/o, Palais des Beaux Arts, Brussels, Belgium, (travelling exhibition)
Informationsdienst c/o, Goethe House, New York, USA, (travelling exhibition)
Informationsdienst c/o, Grazer Kunstverein, Graz, Austria, (travelling exhibition)
Informationsdienst c/o, Sous-sol, Geneva, Switzerland, (travelling exhibition)
Serial – Ein limitierter Laden von Michelle Nicol, Zurich, Switzerland
1992
Blumen, Bilderraum, Zurich, Switzerland
1989
Kunsthaus Oerlikon, Zurich, Switzerland
1988
Junge Schweizer KünstlerInnen, Stiftung Merian, Muba 88, Basel, Switzerland

Public conversations

2004

Gespräche über die Arbeit, Zeughaus Teufen, Teufen, Switzerland

1997

Wie entsteht das Wertvolle, with Christina Bechtler, Galerie Agathe Nisple, St.Gallen, Switzerland

Concepts and Projects

2017
The Inventory of Happiness, Angela Weber Möbel, Zurich, Switzerland
2016
Glassware, MMperformance (UA) by Christoph Gallio und Caro Niederer,
Aktionshalle Stanzerei, Baden, Switzerland
1997
World of Interiors, Janet Paris, Andreas Rüthi, Bridget Smith, Binz 39, Zurich
1993
Forum Information, with Marc Jancou, Galerie Marc Jancou, Zurich
1992
Oriental Spirit in Contemporary Zurich Flats, with Stephanie Thalmann, Video, 90’

Awards and grants

2004: Manor Kunstpreis
2000: AR-Kulturstiftung, grant
1997: IBK Förderpreis 1997
1996: AR-Kulturstiftung, grant
1995: Werkstipendium der Stadt Zurich
1992: AR-Kulturstiftung, grant
1990: Pro Helvetia grant and studio in Schabramant, Cairo/EG

References

1963 births
Living people
20th-century Swiss painters
Swiss women painters
21st-century Swiss painters
Swiss contemporary artists